Rozi Khan Kakar is a Pakistani politician and chief of the Sultanzai tribe who has been a member of Senate of Pakistan, since March 2012.

Education
He has the degree of Bachelor of Laws and a degree of the Master of Arts.

Political career
He was elected to the Senate of Pakistan as a candidate of Pakistan Peoples Party in 2012 Pakistani Senate election.

References

Living people
Pakistani senators (14th Parliament)
Pakistan People's Party politicians
1969 births